Cains can refer to:

Places
 Cains Creek,  a stream in Pike County in the U.S. state of Missouri
 Cains River, a Canadian river

People

Surname
 Bev Cains (born 1938), Australian politician
 Carole Cains (born 1943), Australian politician
 Harriet Cains (born 1993), British actress

Other uses 
 Cains (law firm), a law firm in the Isle of Man
 Cains Brewery
  CAINS – Clinical Assessment Interview for Negative Symptoms (in schizophrenia)

See also
Cain (disambiguation)
Caine (disambiguation)
Caines